Tribuzy is a Brazilian heavy metal band fronted by Renato Tribuzy. They have toured with Iron Maiden frontman Bruce Dickinson and guitarist/producer Roy Z.  A live album called Execution – Live Reunion was released in May 2007.

Members
Renato Tribuzy – vocals
Flavio Pascarillo – drums
Ivan Guilhon – bass
Eduardo Fernandez – guitar
Frank Schieber – guitar

Former members
Gustavo Silveira – guitar

Guest members
Bruce Dickinson – vocals
Ralf Scheepers – vocals
Michael Kiske – vocals
Mat Sinner – vocals
Roy Z – guitar and production
Roland Grapow – guitar
Kiko Loureiro – guitar
Chris Dale – bass
Sidney Sohn – keyboards

Discography
Execution (2005)
Execution – Live Reunion (2007, live)

References

Brazilian heavy metal musical groups
Musical groups established in 2004
2004 establishments in Brazil